Finlay Sinclair-Smith (born 21 April 2000) is an English semi-professional footballer who plays for Bamber Bridge, as a winger.

Career
Born in Liverpool, Sinclair-Smith joined Blackpool in 2013. He scored on his senior debut, in a 1–1 home draw against Wigan Athletic on 29 August 2017 in the EFL Trophy. In December 2017 he was one of 11 young players recognised by the League Football Education for their achievements "on and off the pitch". He signed a professional contract with Blackpool in May 2018.

Sinclair-Smith was loaned to Marine on 22 September 2018 for 28 days. He remained at the club until January 2019. In February 2019 he moved on loan to Widnes.

He was released by Blackpool in the summer of 2019 after his contract expired. He signed for Longridge Town for the 2019–20 season.

In December 2019 he joined FC United of Manchester and made his debut as a substitute on 21 December in a match against Grantham Town.

He signed for Northern Premier League Premier League side Bamber Bridge on a free transfer in September 2021.

Career statistics

References

2000 births
Living people
English footballers
Blackpool F.C. players
Marine F.C. players
Widnes F.C. players
Longridge Town F.C. players
F.C. United of Manchester players
Northern Premier League players
Association football wingers
Bamber Bridge F.C. players